H4H may refer to:
 Habitat for Humanity, an international housing charity
 Help for Heroes, a British veteran's organization
 Hiro H4H, a Japanese interwar bomber

 Human for Human, Polish agencja rekrutacji